The Committee on Coinage, Weights, and Measures (established as the Committee on a Uniform System of Coinage, Weights, and Measures) was a standing committee of the United States House of Representatives from 1864 to 1946.

History

In 1864, the Committee on a Uniform System of Coinage, Weights, and Measures was established to relieve the House Committee on Ways and Means of part of its workload. The name was shortened to Committee on Coinage, Weights, and Measures in 1867. In 1921, the portion of the committee's jurisdiction relating to stabilization of the currency was transferred to the House Committee on Banking and Currency. Under the Legislative Reorganization Act of 1946, the coinage portion of its jurisdiction was also transferred to that committee, while its weights and measures jurisdiction was transferred to the House Committee on Interstate and Foreign Commerce, thus dissolving the committee.

Jurisdiction

The jurisdiction of the Committee on Coinage, Weights, and Measures included the subjects listed in its name: coinage, weights, and measures. The coinage part of the jurisdiction included the defining and fixing of standards of value and the regulation of coinage and exchange. This included the coinage of silver and the purchase of bullion, the exchange of gold coins for gold bars, the subject of mutilated coins, and the coinage of souvenir and commemorative coins. The committee's jurisdiction also included legislation related to mints and assay offices and the establishment of legal standards of value in the insular possessions.

Chairmen

References

Coinage, Weights, and Measures